Gul Mohamad Zhowandai (1905–1988) son of Khair Mohamad khan was born in Kabul, Afghanistan. A poet and writer, his publications were novels written in Persian, and several volumes of inspirational verse. He was editor of Islah and Anis Publications in 1950s. He was 83 years old when he died.

His published works include:

Ferroz — short stories (Kabul, Afghanistan)
Ahrezo ah ye per ahshoob — short stories (Kabul, Afghanistan: Islla Publications)
Kachkol — novel (Kabul, Afghanistan)
Collection of Poems (Kabul, Afghanistan: Islla, Anis)

In Timeri Murari's novel The Taliban Cricket Club the narrator described Gul as "our most celebrated poet and writer."

Sources
Modern Fiction In Afghanistan (Taraneh Publication)
An Encyclopedia of Persian Literature in Afghanistan Vol. 3 (Tehran, 1999)
Mahseerin Sukhanwar (Kabul, Afghanistan)

References

External links

1905 births
1988 deaths
Afghan male short story writers
20th-century Afghan poets
Afghan novelists
20th-century novelists
20th-century poets
20th-century short story writers
20th-century male writers
20th-century Afghan writers